James or Jim Yates may refer to:

James Yates (jurist), American attorney and jurist
James Yates (minister) (1789–1871), English Unitarian minister and scholar
James Yates (poet) (fl. 1582), English poet
James Yates (cricketer) (1883–1929), English cricketer and British Indian Army officer
Jamie Yates (born 1988), English footballer
Jim Yates (bowls) (born 1934), former Australian lawn and indoor bowler and coach
Jim Yates (politician), American politician in Kentucky
James Yates (activist), African American anti-fascist
Jimmy Yates (1869–1922), footballer
 The James Yates murders, a 1781 multiple homicide, the basis for the early American novel Wieland

See also
James Yeats (disambiguation)